George Gordon McLintock, Vice Admiral (USMS), (February 10, 1903 – April 23, 1990) was the longest serving Superintendent of the United States Merchant Marine Academy, one of the 5 United States service academies, serving from 1948 to 1970.

Biography
Born in Dysart, Scotland of a long tradition of British merchant marine seaman, McLintock first went to sea on a passenger liner with his merchant marine officer father, William McLintock, at the age of 3 years. Himself, commissioned a cadet in the British merchant navy in 1918, McLintock had a 30-year career as a merchant marine officer before being named the 4th Superintendent of the United States Merchant Marine Academy in 1948. McLintock, who became a naturalized United States citizen in 1921, was chief inspection officer of that country's War Shipping Administration during the Second World War. He was also president of the American Institute of Navigation from 1947 to 1949. The Vice Admiral was a graduate of the United Kingdom’s Sevenoaks School (founded 1432 AD). He died of bone cancer in Chevy Chase, Maryland.

Honors and awards
Naval Reserve Medal with star (20 years) 
American Campaign Medal
World War II Victory Medal
World War II Victory Medal, U.S. Merchant Marine
Order of Saint Dennis of Zante (Greece), Knight Commander
British War Medal (United Kingdom)
Victory Medal (United Kingdom)
Officer, Philippine Legion of Honor (8 point Star)
Officer, Order of Maritime Merit (France)
Officer, Order of Polonia Restitute (Poland)
Silver Cross of Merit with Swords (Poland)
American Legion Distinguished Service Medal
Greek American War Veterans Medal

References

1903 births
1990 deaths
Merchant Marine Mariners sailors
United States Merchant Marine Academy superintendents
United States Navy admirals
People educated at Sevenoaks School
20th-century American academics